Cryptorama vorticale is a species of beetle in the family Ptinidae. It is found in North America.

Subspecies
These two subspecies belong to the species Cryptorama vorticale:
 Cryptorama vorticale minor Fall, 1905
 Cryptorama vorticale vorticale Fall, 1905

References

Further reading

 
 

Bostrichoidea
Articles created by Qbugbot
Beetles described in 1905